Pampeloponnisiako Stadium ("Pan-Peloponnese Stadium") is a stadium located in Patras, Greece. The stadium was originally built 1981 as National Stadium of Patras (Εθνικό Στάδιο Πατρών, Ethniko Stadio Patron).

In 2002, reconstruction works began and it reopened on 8 August 2004, just in time to host football (soccer) matches for the 2004 Summer Olympics. The stadium seats 23,588, though only 18,900 seats were publicly available for the Olympic matches.

It is owned by the Public Real Estate Company S.A., a state-owned company, and it is operated by the Municipality of Patras.

References

External links
Olympicproperties.gr profile
Stadia,gr profile

Football venues in Greece
Venues of the 2004 Summer Olympics
Olympic football venues
Sports venues in Patras
Multi-purpose stadiums in Greece
Athletics (track and field) venues in Greece